Justin S. Hill is an American businessman and politician from the state of Missouri. A Republican, Hill was first elected to the Missouri House of Representatives from Missouri's 108th District in November 2014 and served until his resignation in January 2022. He represented a portion of St. Charles County in the Lake St. Louis area, south of I-70 and straddling U.S. Route 40/61. Hill previously served in the O'Fallon Police Department.

After Joe Biden won the 2020 presidential election and Donald Trump refused to concede while making false claims of fraud, Hill sponsored a declarative resolution in the Missouri House of Representatives to say that Missouri's lawmakers "have no faith in the validity" of the results of the 2020 presidential election. On January 6, 2021, Hill skipped his own inauguration to meet with his federal delegation in Washington, D.C. to discuss his resolution's passage.

Of his presence near the Capitol after the Save-America rally, he said, "I wasn't close enough to see anything. I didn't see any vandalism." He said the crowds at the rally and at the Capitol were "different people". Hill said he was disappointed with the way things worked out, adding, "It's such a sad day."

In 2021, Hill supported Republican efforts in the Missouri legislature to not implement Medicaid expansion, even though Missouri voters voted for it in a referendum. Hill said, "Even though my constituents voted for this lie, I am going to protect them from this lie."

On January 3, 2022, Hill announced his resignation from the Missouri House effective January 5. Media reports noted its being a day short of the anniversary of the U.S. Capitol attack. Hill said he would be moving to Florida, for business reasons.

On Hill's final day as a representative, he criticized several situations he considered wrong, including the state's initiative petition process, saying "The people are always going to vote for things that are going to sound good."

Election results

References

21st-century American politicians
Bellevue University alumni
Living people
People from Lake St. Louis, Missouri
Protesters in or near the January 6 United States Capitol attack
Republican Party members of the Missouri House of Representatives
Year of birth missing (living people)